"Cuando nos volvamos a encontrar" is a song by Colombian singer-songwriter Carlos Vives featuring the American singer Marc Anthony, for his fourteenth studio album Más + Corazón Profundo (2014). The song was released by Sony Music Latin as the second single from the record.

The song served as the main theme for the Chilean telenovela, Pituca Sin Lucas. Even, Vives travelled to Chile in August 2014 to film the music video for the telenovela. "Cuando Nos Volvamos a Encontrar" won the Latin Grammy Award for Best Tropical Song. "Cuando Nos Volvamos a Encontrar" was nominated for Tropical Collaboration of the Year and the music video for Video of the Year at the Lo Nuestro Awards of 2015.

Track listing 
Digital download
 "Cuando Nos Volvamos a Encontrar" -

Charts

Weekly charts

Year-end charts

See also
List of Billboard number-one Latin songs of 2014

References 

2014 songs
2014 singles
Carlos Vives songs
Marc Anthony songs
Spanish-language songs
Sony Music Latin singles
Male vocal duets
Songs written by Carlos Vives
Songs written by Andrés Castro
Number-one singles in Colombia
Record Report Top 100 number-one singles
Record Report Top Latino number-one singles
Latin Grammy Award for Best Tropical Song